Ughele is an Oceanic language spoken by about 1200 people on Rendova Island,  located in the Western Province of the Solomon Islands.

There is no internal dialect differentiation.

Phonology
The following information is gathered from Benedicte Haraldstad Frostad. A Grammar of Ughele: A Language of The Solomon Islands. 2012. Pages 35–48

Vowel inventory 
Ughele contains a five-vowel inventory that is typical of most Oceanic languages.
These are differentiated by changes in the place of articulation and the degree of stricture required to produce the sound.
Lip rounding only accounts for the differentiation of two segments.
These are the close-mid back vowel  and the close back vowel .

There is no variation in vowel length.

Minimal pairs

Distinguished by place of articulation 
 and  - 'flying fox' and 'bald'
 and  - 'we/us' and 'you'

Distinguished by level of stricture 
 and  - 'stone' and 'mangrove'
 and  - 'thousand' and 'body'
 and  - 'slippery cabbage' and 'fire'
 and  - 'lake' and 'to pick'

Consonant inventory 
Ughele has 18 consonants and no consonant clusters, unless spoken accidentally.

Stops 
Ughele contains bilabial, alveolar and velar stops.
 and 
All voiced stops are pre-nasalised, however the degree of this varies between speakers. Pronunciation of this runs from barely audible nasalisation to almost fully nasalised segments. E.g.  → ,   → ,  → 

 Nasal and oral pairs for all voiced stops e.g.  → ,  → ,  → 
 Voiced velar nasals and non-nasals e.g.  'open' →  'a fish species'
 Voiced bilabial, alveolar and velar stops e.g.  'tired' →  'happy' →  'spirit, devil'
 Unvoiced stops  (negation indicator),  (location phrase indicator),  (possession indicator)
 Voiced bilabial/alveolar/velar nasals e.g.  'obey',  'sagopalm pudding',  'sharp, long'

Alveolar trill 
There is only one found in Ughele; this is in the lexeme  ('rope').

Fricatives 
 Labiodental  and velar  are voiced and →  'you' and  'to put'
 Glottal fricatives are unvoiced  'to wipe' and  'to tie'
 Voiced and unvoiced alveolars  'hot drink' and  'penis'

The affricate  
This post-alveolar affricate is sometimes realised as a palatal nasal stop , although this is relatively rare in spoken language and therefore is speaker-dependent. 

 →  ~ 

Approximants 
Ughele contains one alveolar lateral approximant  and one labial velar .
However,  only occurs in a small set of loanwords from English and Roviana (another Solomon Island language originally developed for trade).
'Window' – 
'Week' – 
'Win' – 
'Year' –

Minimal pairs based on manner of articulation 
Voiced alveolar plosive  'to let', and fricative,  'flesh'
Unvoiced alveolar plosive  'holy', and fricative  'hunt'
Voiced velar plosive  '1st/p possessive', and fricative  'just'

Written language
Prior to the efforts of Frostad et al. Ughele had no documented history or written language standard. After these efforts Ughele is now written in Latin script as shown in these notes.

Morphology

Pronouns and person marking 
Ughele, like many other Oceanic languages, possesses a complex pronominal system that includes personal, relative and interrogative pronouns (Frostad, 2012, p. 81–88).

Personal pronouns

Personal pronouns predominate in terms of quantity; there are six types of pronoun forms: independent pronouns, preverbal subject partial clitics, postverbal subject pronouns, object clitics, preposed possessive pronouns and attributive suffixes (Frostad, 2012, p. 81-88). Personal pronouns are marked for number and clusivity. In each of these types, distinctions are made between singular and plural forms, as well as first, second, and third person (Frostad, 2012, p. 81). Inclusive and exclusive forms for first-person plural are separated; the inclusive form extends to include the addressee whereas the addressee is then excluded from the extension of the exclusive form (Frostad, 2012, p. 81). There are partial formal similarities, and in some cases a complete overlap of forms between the types (Frostad, 2012, p. 81). The table below is an overview of the various types of personal pronouns.

Personal pronouns in Ughele can occupy various positions throughout the clause, with some types being more restricted in their use than others.

Independent pronouns 
Independent pronouns may act as the head of a noun phrase, taking on the forms of subject, direct object, or indirect object as a complement to prepositions (Frostad, 2012, p. 81). They may also appear in possessive constructions.

Above is an example of the third-person plural pronoun  and first-person plural exclusive pronoun  in noun phrases headed by pronouns. The numeral modifier  follows the pronoun head, whereas it would typically precede a noun head (Frostad, 2012, p. 82).

Ughele has object marking clitics and two different sets of subject markers, and these occur in specific fixed positions relative to the verb (Frostad, 2012, 169).

Object clitics 
Object clitics are pronominal forms, which only occur with verb stems and only mark direct object (Frostad, 2012, 85).

First-person singular exclusive object clitic  attached to verb stem

Third-person singular object clitic  attached to transitive suffix –i

Third-person singular object clitic  attached to transitive suffix 

Object clitics may be the only referent to the object in the clause (5) or they may occur with a coreferential noun phrase (6) (Frostad, 2012, p. 85).

Second-person singular 

Second-person singular object clitic  with coreferential noun phrase second-person singular independent pronoun :

Preverbal subject partial clitics 
Preverbal subject marking pronouns in Ughele can appear in the form of partial clitics. These clitics precede the verb complex, but only in very specific constructions (Frostad, p. 82). They cliticize to two particles, the homophonous imperative mood marker  (7), and conjunction  'then' (8), and they occur as independent forms indicating pivots in complex clauses (9) (Frostad, 2012, p. 171). This aspect of Ughele's grammar bears resemblance to that of three of its nearest neighbouring languages, Hoava, Roviana and Marovo, with that of Marovo being the most similar (Frostad, 2012, p. 171).

First-person plural inclusive preverbal subject clitic  attached to mood marker 

Second-person singular preverbal subject clitic  attached to conjunction 

Third-person plural preverbal subject independent form

Postverbal subject pronouns 
In Ughele, postverbal subject pronouns overlap completely with preposed possessive pronouns (Frostad, 2012, p. 84). Postverbal subject pronouns mark various types of foci, where the pronouns would refer to the focused constituent (Frostad, 2012, p. 85). Below is an example of the third-person plural postverbal subject pronoun used in a sentence.

Demonstratives 
Demonstrative particles are a grammatical function that indicate specific entities as well as addressing deixis. Demonstratives in Ughele are separated into three categories based on deictic distance and further identified as singular or plural. Within Ughele morphology, these particles appear after the head noun within the noun phrase, taking the final position. Ughele follows linguistic trends in Oceanic languages with regards to sentence construction with demonstratives. Within the language families of the Solomon Islands, there is a linguistic trend of separating definite articles and root nouns. The common word order throughout the languages of the Solomon Islands is noun-demonstrative, as noted in nearby Oceanic languages Hoava and Roviana. This trend is universal to the region.

Included are the glosses for some noun phrases in Ughele to demonstrate the function of demonstratives. These glosses are translated to English below. The examples showcase the word order of Ughele noun phrases as well as the function of the distance particles when compared to English.

Demonstratives functioning as interrogatives 
Intermediate distance particles are often found to be used the least, with an implied distance, a common occurrence in Oceanic languages identified by Lynch, Ross and Crowley. As a result of this implied meaning, these particles can often take other grammatical functions. Frostad describes the common phoneme between the intermediate singular particle and the interrogative 'what' in Ughele, . The following example is from Frostad's grammar of Ughele, demonstrating the aforementioned dual function.

It is demonstrated in this example that , when paired with other articles, endures a function adjustment. These are not the only forms of the interrogatives [what] and [where]; there are grammatical words that occupy the same meaning in interrogative clauses.

Interrogatives 
In order to construct an interrogative clause, without pretext; there are a series of grammatical function words with corresponding meanings given below. Additionally, there are other means to construct an interrogative clause in Ughele, the function of this is context dependent, relying on situational anaphora. Ughele generally follows the linguistic trends relating to interrogative clause construction for the region, confirmed by the nature of Roviana and Hoava to exclusively use intonation as a question marker. However, Ughele also occasionally uses a question particle in interrogative construction; the conditions for this are outlined below.

Question particle 
In Ughele, there is a single question particle, . This marker has a purely grammatical function denoting the sentence as a question. It is usually paired with one of the above interrogatives. This marker is not used exclusively; rather, it is a marker denoting conversational foci used in specific sentence types outlined below.

Simple interrogatives 
A locative interrogative clause in Ughele generally follows the pattern: NP [] [], fronted by the noun phrase, then using the preposition locative . This kind of question is used within brief exchanges, attempting to gain new knowledge quickly.

Context-dependent interrogatives 
Without a preposition,  gains the affix , becoming  and it appears before the noun phrase:  NP. This occurs when the question is influenced by pragmatic focus, a newly understood meaning based on what a speaker has informed a hearer. This kind of sentence would be used during an extended conversation either as a response or a concurrent idea, in contrast to the former as a simple interrogative or a conversation starter.

This is exclusive to the anaphoric pretext of the conversation. Therefore,  ('what') is a reference to a specific question from conversational context.

Possessive constructions 

Possession in Ughele, as in many Oceanic languages, can be sorted into two types of construction, direct and indirect. Direct possessive constructions involve a prenominal attributive suffix, while the indirect possessive constructions distinguished between three further types, two which express possession through prepositional phrases, one with the preposition , the other with the preposition . The third indirect possessive construction uses a possessive pronoun which modifies the possessum noun. (Frostad, 2012, p.117) Ughele also distinguishes alienable possession from inalienable possession, and this influences to varying degrees which construction will be used. However, it is important to note that inalienable and alienable possession distinction is not a so much a binary construction but rather a spectrum, which demonstrates tendencies for different relationships between possessor and possessum to take certain possessive constructions. 
Table 2 illustrates the general tendencies for correlation between semantic meaning and choice of possessive construction.

Direct possessive construction 
The direct possessive construction in Ughele is similar to many Oceanic languages and identical to Proto-Oceanic's direct possessive construction. It involves an attributive suffix which occurs prenominally on the possessum noun; this indexes number and person of the possessor as in (11). (Frostad, 2012, p.119) 

Generally, intrinsically inalienable possession takes the indirect possessive construction – that is, things which the possessor has no real control of their possession over, such as body parts or kinship terms. Direct possessive constructions are used in Ughele mainly for intrinsically inalienable possessive relationships such as the body and its parts, as well as certain kinship terms. Less inherently inalienable possessive relationships may also tend towards a direct possessive construction with entities being referent possessum nouns within the construction when they are a part of a larger whole. (Frostad, 2012, p.123) However, the relationship between lexical items and possessive constructions is by no means stringent.

Attributive suffixes are what are often labeled as possessive suffixes in most other Oceanic languages (Frostad, 2012, p. 87), but in Ughele, they also have other functions (Frostad, 2012, p. 87).
In direct possessive constructions, attributive suffixes may either agree with the possessor noun (12) or be the only expression of the possessor (13).

Attributive suffixes are also used to derive nominal attributive modifiers from adjectival verbs, indicating the number and person of the referent of the head noun (14) (Frostad, 2012, p. 87).

Possessive constructions using prepositions  and  
The structure of the construction is identical for either preposition which is used in a prepositional phrase which follows the possessum noun, as in (15) and (16). While not as commonly as the direct possessive construction,  and  can be used for intrinsically unalienable possession such as body parts, as in (15). (Frostad, 2012 p.127) Indirect possessive constructions using  are the most frequently used in Frostad's 2012 corpus, being fairly versatile and widely spread across situations. Both  and  can be used for kinship terms, inalienable body parts, unowned possessions such as names, as well as for actions carried out by the referent of the possessor noun. (Frostad, 2012, p.130)

Possessive constructions using a possessive pronoun 
Preposed possessive pronouns which modify a possessum noun make up one of the three indirect possessive marking strategies in Ughele (Frostad, p. 86). The possessor may or may not be expressed in a noun phrase.

The previous two examples illustrates the flexibility in the possessive pronoun construction when expressing a possessor noun. In (17) the possessor is expressed in a noun phrase, specifically the second-person singular pronoun , while (18) does not express a possessor at all. 

All other forms of possessive pronouns are compiled in the table below.

References

Notes

Sources 

 
 
 

Northwest Solomonic languages
Languages of the Solomon Islands
Western Province (Solomon Islands)